Juniperus phoenicea, the Phoenicean juniper or Arâr, is a juniper found throughout the Mediterranean region.

Description
The bark, which can be peeled in strips, is dark grayish-brown. It is largely monoecious, but some individual plants are dioecious. The female cones are berrylike, 6–14 mm in diameter, orange-brown, occasionally with a pinkish waxy bloom, and contain 3–8 seeds; they are mature in about 18 months, and are mainly dispersed by birds. The male cones are 2–4 mm long, and shed their pollen in early spring, which is then dispersed by wind.

Taxonomy
There are two varieties, treated as subspecies by some authors and as separate species by others:
Juniperus phoenicea var. phoenicea = J. phoenicea. Throughout the range of the species. Cones globose, about as wide as long. Leaves are small and obtuse. Sheds pollen in the spring.
Juniperus phoenicea var. turbinata (syn. Juniperus turbinata). Confined to coastal sand dune habitats. Cones oval, narrower than long. Leaves are long and thin. Sheds pollen in the autumn.

Distribution and habitat
The species is found throughout the Mediterranean region, from Morocco and Portugal east to Croatia, Italy, Turkey and Egypt, south on the mountains of Lebanon, the Palestine region and in western Saudi Arabia near the Red Sea, and also on Madeira and the Canary Islands.

Ecology
The species prefers a hot, arid climate with a lot of light, and grows on rocky or sandy ground. Its preferred soil is calcareous with a pH between 7.7 and 7.9 (moderately basic), but could also be silicate. It can often be found forming scrubs and thickets with other species. In its natural range of France and Spain, J. phoenicea has a generational life of 25 years, and is considered a stable species on the 2016 IUCN Red List of Threatened Species.

Its habitat in coastal areas is most threatened by the presence of humans, both settled and touring. Humans also plant not-naturally-present plants such as pines, black locust, French tamarisk, desert false Indigo, American agave, tree of heaven, and some succulent plants from South Africa. The purpose of this is usually to stabilize the dunes, but these outside plants interfere with the natural vegetation. It is also threatened easily by fires, because it is quite flammable and does not regenerate well. This makes it necessary to plant new organisms after a fire has damaged the others.

Uses

Juniper berries are used as a seasoning in cooking or in alcoholic beverages, particularly to flavor gin. Juniper berries have also been used in traditional medicine for different conditions, although there is no high-quality clinical evidence that it has any effect. Although extracts of juniper berries or wood tar have been used as an aromaparticularly for cosmeticsthe safety of using ointments manufactured from J. phoenicea and related species has not been adequately demonstrated, according to a 2001 review. Juniper extracts used topically may cause skin allergic reactions, and should be avoided during pregnancy.

The tree's essential oil is especially rich in the tricyclic sesquiterpene thujopsene. The heartwood contains an estimated 2.2% of thujopsene. The biochemist Jarl Runeburg noted in 1960 that J. phoenicea appears to be the most convenient source of thujopsene so far encountered." Juniper wood is used for small manufactured objects and inlay works in carpentry, and in building construction in Africa where it is mainly used for fuel and producing charcoal.

Culture
It is the vegetable symbol of the island of El Hierro.

See also
 List of animal and plant symbols of the Canary Islands

References

External links

phoenicea
Flora of North Africa
Flora of Southeastern Europe
Flora of Southwestern Europe
Flora of Western Asia
Flora of the Canary Islands
Plants described in 1753
Taxa named by Carl Linnaeus
Taxa named by Aimé Bonpland
Taxa named by Alexander von Humboldt
Flora of the Mediterranean Basin